The marabbecca is a legendary creature that originates from Sicily. The creature, likely of Arab origin lives in wells and reservoirs, takes the appearance of a woman or amphibian and only moves at night. It is believed to have been invented by Sicilian parents to prevent their children from playing near wells.

See also
Borda

References 

Italian legendary creatures